Vocals are musical sounds produced with the voice.

Vocals may also refer to:

 SoCal VoCals, an American vocal group
 VOCALS, a meteorology field project
 Vocals (phonetics), sounds made by a human being using the vocal folds